Michelle (Messina) Reale  (January 31, Ambler, Pennsylvania) is an Italian-American  poet, academic  and ethnographer.

Reale is an associate professor at Arcadia University in Glenside, Pennsylvania.  She uses poetic inquiry to present her research among African refugees in Sicily and her poetry is mainly concerned with Italian-American life, ethnic identity,  histories, family dynamics and remembrance and forgetting.  Among master's degrees in English and library and information science, she has an MFA in creative writing with a concentration in poetry. She has twice been nominated for a Pushcart Prize.

Books 
Poetry

Season of Subtraction (Bordighera Press, 2019)
All These Things Were Real: Poems of Delirium Tremens (West Philly Press, 2017)
Birds of Sicily (Aldrich Press, 2016)
The Legacy of the Sidelong Glance: Elegies (Aldrich Press, 2014)
Natural Habitat (Burning River, 2011)
Like Lungfish Getting Through the Dry Season (Thunderclap Press, 2012)
If All They Had Were Their Bodies (Burning River, 2013)
This is Not a Situation in Which You Should Remain Calm (Cervena Barva Press, 2014)

Academic

 Mentoring and Managing Students in the Academic Library (ALA Editions, 2012)
 Becoming an Embedded Librarian (ALA Editions, 2015)

References

External links
 http://www.sempresiclia.wordpress.com Blog
 http://www.michellmessinareale.com Official website

Year of birth missing (living people)
Living people
American writers of Italian descent
Arcadia University faculty
American women poets
American ethnographers
American women anthropologists
American women academics
21st-century American women